Hagan is an originally Irish surname related linguistically to Hogan (see details on that page). 

Notable people with the surname include:
Alexandra Hagan (born 1991), Australian rower
Alfie Hagan (1895–1980), English footballer
Art Hagan (1863–1936), American baseball player
Barry Hagan (1957–1993), American figure skater
Bill Hagan (born 1931), Canadian ice hockey player
Billy Hagan (disambiguation), multiple people
Bo Hagan (1925–2002), American football and baseball player
Bob Hagan (born 1949), American politician
Bob Hagan (rugby league) (born 1940), Australian rugby league footballer
Brian Hagan, American artist
Charles Hagan (born 2001), English footballer
Chris Hagan (born 1989), American basketball player
Christina Hagan (born 1988), American politician
Cliff Hagan (born 1931), American basketball player
Cliona Hagan (born 1989), Irish singer
Darian Hagan (born 1970), American football player
David Hagan, American business executive
David Hagan (cricketer) (born 1966), English cricketer
Derek Hagan (born 1984), American football player
Ebenezer Hagan (born 1975), Ghanaian footballer
Edward Hagan (disambiguation), multiple people
Ellen Hagan, Ghanaian entrepreneur
Emmanuel Hagan (born 2000), Ghanaian footballer
Fred Hagan (1918–2003), Canadian artist
George Hagan (disambiguation), multiple people
Glenn Hagan (born 1955), American basketball player
Helen Eugenia Hagan (1891–1964), American pianist
Helene Hagan (born 1939), American anthropologist
Holly Hagan (born 1992), British television personality
Holly Hagan (epidemiologist), American epidemiologist
Jacqueline Hagan (born 1954), American sociologist
James Hagan (disambiguation), multiple people
Javon Hagan (born 1997), American football player
Jean Hagen (1923–1977), American actress 
Jim Hagan (born 1956), Northern Irish footballer
Jim Hagan (basketball) (1938–2021), American basketball player
Jimmy Hagan (1918–1998), English footballer
John Hagan (disambiguation), multiple people
Joseph Essilfie Hagan (1912–??), Ghanaian politician
Kay Hagan (1953–2019), American politician
Kenneth J. Hagan, American historian
Kevin Hagan (1928–2005), New Zealand footballer
Kobina Hagan (1923–1977), Ghanaian politician
Lyn Hagan, British writer and artist
Mallory Hagan (born 1988), American politician
Marianne Hagan (born 1966), American actress
Matt Hagan (born 1982), American race car driver
Maura Hagan, American professor
Michael Hagan (born 1964), Australian rugby league footballer
Molly Hagan (born 1961), American actress
Patrick Hagan (1879–1916), Scottish footballer
Peter Monroe Hagan (1871–1930), American sheriff
Priscilla Hagan (born 1996), Ghanaian footballer
Robert Hagan (disambiguation), multiple people
Sarah Hagan (born 1984), American actress
Stephen Hagan (disambiguation), multiple people
Susannah Hagan (born 1951), English researcher
Thomas Hagan (born 1941), American assassin
Tim Hagan (born 1946), American politician
Tom Hagan (born 1947), American basketball player
Willie J. Hagan, American academic administrator

See also
Senator Hagan (disambiguation)
Mary Hagan-Harrell, American politician
O'Hagan, an Irish surname